"About the Money" is a song by American hip hop recording artist T.I., released on June 3, 2014, through Grand Hustle Records and Columbia Records, as the first single from his ninth studio album Paperwork. The song, which features guest vocals from fellow Atlanta-based rapper Young Thug, was produced by Young Thug's frequent collaborator London on da Track.

Music video 
The music video, directed by Kennedy Rothchild and T.I. himself, was released on June 2, 2014. American rapper Birdman, makes a cameo appearance.

Live performances
On August 8, 2014, T.I. appeared on The Tonight Show Starring Jimmy Fallon, where he performed a medley of the album's lead singles, "No Mediocre" and "About the Money", alongside Young Thug. On October 13, 2014, T.I. appeared on Jimmy Kimmel Live!, where he performed "About the Money", as well as "No Mediocre". On October 14, T.I. and Young Thug performed "About the Money" at the 2014 BET Hip Hop Awards.

Remix
In an interview with The Breakfast Club, T.I. confirmed that Lil Wayne and Young Jeezy, will be featured on the official remix to "About the Money". The remix was released on October 24, 2014, via DJ Whoo Kid's SoundCloud page and features verses from Wayne and Jeezy, as well as new verses from T.I. and Young Thug.

Chart performance

Weekly charts

Year-end charts

Certifications

Release history

References

External links 
 

2014 singles
2014 songs
T.I. songs
Young Thug songs
Grand Hustle Records singles
Columbia Records singles
Songs written by T.I.
Songs written by Young Thug
Songs written by London on da Track
Song recordings produced by London on da Track